Bhuvnesh Mann  is an Indian television actor, was born in Delhi, India. He appeared as not the main lead in television show Dahhej as Soham mehta on NDTV Imagine after Dahhej he played the role of Arjun in the television show Dehleez on NDTV Imagine and did many modeling assignments apart from featuring in advertisements and music videos and also played the role of Dev Goenka in very popular and famous Indian television Soap Opera show Ek Hasina Thi 2014.

Television
2007 - Dahhej as Soham Mehta
2007 - Ssshhhh...Phir Koi Hai (Episode 55: Karkhana) as Shahid
2007 - Ssshhhh...Phir Koi Hai (Episode 58-59: Souten) as Ranveer
2011 - Maayke Se Bandhi Dor as Kartik
2012 - Haunted Nights (Episode: Aakhri Khwahish) as Sunil
2014 - Ek Hasina Thi as Dev Goenka
2016 - Darr Sabko Lagta Hai (episode twenty eight) as Raj

Filmography
2019 War (2019 film) as Ship Helmsman 
2017 Dil Jo Na Keh Saka as Chef Kabir

References

Living people
Male actors from Delhi
Indian male television actors
21st-century Indian male actors
1984 births